Bruno Arrabal Passamani (born 22 February 1992) is a Brazilian footballer who plays as a defensive midfielder for Kosovan club KF Arbëria.

Club career
Born in Ouro Preto do Oeste, Rondônia, Arrabal graduated with Atlético Sorocaba's youth setup, and made his senior debuts while on loan at Vilhena in 2012. In January 2013 he moved to Águia de Marabá, but was released in April, after appearing rarely.

On 28 June 2013 Arrabal joined Duque de Caxias, appearing regularly in Série C and in Copa Rio, as his side were crowned champions of the latter. On 10 January of the following year, he signed a four-month deal with Remo.

On 24 March 2014 Arrabal was released by Remo, and returned to Duque on 15 April. He appeared regularly for the club, which eventually suffered relegation.

In February 2015 Arrabal signed for Portuguesa, being immediately loaned to Tupi. He made his debut for the latter club on the 22nd, starting in a 1–0 away win against Democrata-GV for the Campeonato Mineiro championship.

On 26 May Arrabal joined Mogi Mirim in Série B, but left the club in June and subsequently signed for Cypriot club Ethnikos Achna FC.

On 30 November 2019 it was confirmed, that Arrabal had joined Kuwaiti club Burgan SC.

Career statistics
(Correct )

References

External links
Sou Duque profile 

1992 births
Living people
Sportspeople from Rondônia
Brazilian footballers
Association football midfielders
Campeonato Brasileiro Série C players
Campeonato Brasileiro Série D players
Cypriot First Division players
Kategoria Superiore players
Clube Atlético Sorocaba players
Águia de Marabá Futebol Clube players
Duque de Caxias Futebol Clube players
Clube do Remo players
Associação Portuguesa de Desportos players
Tupi Football Club players
Ethnikos Achna FC players
FC Kamza players
KF Llapi players
Brazilian expatriate footballers
Brazilian expatriate sportspeople in Cyprus
Brazilian expatriate sportspeople in Albania
Brazilian expatriate sportspeople in Kuwait
Expatriate footballers in Cyprus
Expatriate footballers in Albania
Expatriate footballers in Kosovo
Expatriate footballers in Kuwait
Burgan SC players
Brazilian expatriate sportspeople in Kosovo
Football Superleague of Kosovo players